Timeline of black hole physics

Pre-20th century
 1640 — Ismaël Bullialdus suggests an inverse-square gravitational force law
 1676 — Ole Rømer demonstrates that light has a finite speed
 1684 — Isaac Newton writes down his inverse-square law of universal gravitation
 1758 — Rudjer Josip Boscovich develops his theory of forces, where gravity can be repulsive on small distances. So according to him strange classical bodies, such as white holes, can exist, which won't allow other bodies to reach their surfaces
 1784 — John Michell discusses classical bodies which have escape velocities greater than the speed of light
 1795 — Pierre Laplace discusses classical bodies which have escape velocities greater than the speed of light
 1798 — Henry Cavendish measures the gravitational constant G
 1876 — William Kingdon Clifford suggests that the motion of matter may be due to changes in the geometry of space

20th century

Before 1960s 
 1909 — Albert Einstein, together with Marcel Grossmann, starts to develop a theory which would bind metric tensor gik, which defines a space geometry, with a source of gravity, that is with mass
 1910 — Hans Reissner and Gunnar Nordström defines Reissner–Nordström singularity, Hermann Weyl solves special case for a point-body source
1915 — Albert Einstein presents (David Hilbert presented this independently five days earlier in Göttingen) the complete Einstein field equations at the Prussian Academy meeting in Berlin on 25 November 1915
 1916 — Karl Schwarzschild solves the Einstein vacuum field equations for uncharged spherically-symmetric non-rotating systems
 1917 — Paul Ehrenfest gives conditional principle a three-dimensional space
 1918 — Hans Reissner and Gunnar Nordström solve the Einstein–Maxwell field equations for charged spherically-symmetric non-rotating systems
 1918 — Friedrich Kottler gets Schwarzschild solution without Einstein vacuum field equations
 1923 — George David Birkhoff proves that the Schwarzschild spacetime geometry is the unique spherically symmetric solution of the Einstein vacuum field equations
 1931 — Subrahmanyan Chandrasekhar calculates, using special relativity, that a non-rotating body of electron-degenerate matter above a certain limiting mass (at 1.4 solar masses) has no stable solutions
 1939 — Robert Oppenheimer and Hartland Snyder calculate the gravitational collapse of a pressure-free homogeneous fluid sphere into a black hole
 1958 — David Finkelstein theorises that the Schwarzschild radius is a causality barrier: an event horizon of a black hole

1960s 
 1963 — Roy Kerr solves the Einstein vacuum field equations for uncharged symmetric rotating systems, deriving the Kerr metric for a rotating black hole
 1963 — Maarten Schmidt discovers and analyzes the first quasar, 3C 273, as a highly red-shifted active galactic nucleus, a billion light years away
 1964 — Roger Penrose proves that an imploding star will necessarily produce a singularity once it has formed an event horizon
 1964 — Yakov Zel’dovich and independently Edwin Salpeter propose that accretion discs around supermassive black holes are responsible for the huge amounts of energy radiated by quasars
 1964 — Hong-Yee Chiu coins the word quasar for a 'quasi-stellar radio source' in his article in Physics Today
 1964 — The first recorded use of the term "black hole", by journalist Ann Ewing
 1965 — Ezra T. Newman, E. Couch, K. Chinnapared, A. Exton, A. Prakash, and Robert Torrence solve the Einstein–Maxwell field equations for charged rotating systems
 1966 — Yakov Zel’dovich and Igor Novikov propose searching for black hole candidates among binary systems in which one star is optically bright and X-ray dark and the other optically dark but X-ray bright (the black hole candidate)
 1967 — Jocelyn Bell discovers and analyzes the first radio pulsar, direct evidence for a neutron star
 1967 — Werner Israel presents the proof of the no-hair theorem at King's College London
 1967 — John Wheeler introduces the term "black hole" in his lecture to the American Association for the Advancement of Science
 1968 — Brandon Carter uses Hamilton–Jacobi theory to derive first-order equations of motion for a charged particle moving in the external fields of a Kerr–Newman black hole
 1969 — Roger Penrose discusses the Penrose process for the extraction of the spin energy from a Kerr black hole
 1969 — Roger Penrose proposes the cosmic censorship hypothesis

After 1960s 
 1972 — Identification of Cygnus X-1/HDE 226868 from dynamic observations as the first binary with a stellar black hole candidate 
 1972 — Stephen Hawking proves that the area of a classical black hole's event horizon cannot decrease
 1972 — James Bardeen, Brandon Carter, and Stephen Hawking propose four laws of black hole mechanics in analogy with the laws of thermodynamics
 1972 — Jacob Bekenstein suggests that black holes have an entropy proportional to their surface area due to information loss effects
 1974 — Stephen Hawking applies quantum field theory to black hole spacetimes and shows that black holes will radiate particles with a black-body spectrum which can cause black hole evaporation
 1975 — James Bardeen and Jacobus Petterson show that the swirl of spacetime around a spinning black hole can act as a gyroscope stabilizing the orientation of the accretion disc and jets
 1989 — Identification of microquasar V404 Cygni as a binary black hole candidate system
 1994 — Charles Townes and colleagues observe ionized neon gas swirling around the center of our Galaxy at such high velocities that a possible black hole mass at the very center must be approximately equal to that of 3 million suns

21st century
 2002 — Astronomers at the Max Planck Institute for Extraterrestrial Physics present evidence for the hypothesis that Sagittarius A* is a supermassive black hole at the center of the Milky Way galaxy
 2002 — NASA's Chandra X-ray Observatory identifies double galactic black holes system in merging galaxies NGC 6240
 2004 — Further observations by a team from UCLA present even stronger evidence supporting Sagittarius A* as a black hole
 2006 — The Event Horizon Telescope begins capturing data
 2012 — First visual evidence of black-holes: Suvi Gezari's team in Johns Hopkins University, using the Hawaiian telescope Pan-STARRS 1, publish images of a supermassive black hole 2.7 million light-years away swallowing a red giant
 2015 — LIGO Scientific Collaboration detects the distinctive gravitational waveforms from a binary black hole merging into a final black hole, yielding the basic parameters (e.g., distance, mass, and spin) of the three spinning black holes involved
 2019 — Event Horizon Telescope collaboration releases the first direct photo of a black hole, the supermassive M87* at the core of the Messier 87 galaxy

References

See also
 Timeline of gravitational physics and relativity
 Schwarzschild radius

Black holes
Black hole physics
Black hole physics